Pibor Airport is an airport serving the town of Pibor, in South Sudan.

Location
Pibor Airport  is located in Pibor County in Boma State, in the town of Pibor.

The geographic coordinates of Pibor Airport are: 6° 47' 24.00"N, 33° 8' 6.00"E (Latitude: 6.7900; Longitude: 33.1350).

Overview
Pibor Airport is a small civilian airport that serves the town of Pibor and surrounding communities. There are no known scheduled airlines serving Pibor Airport at this time.

See also
 Pibor
 Jonglei
 Greater Upper Nile
 List of airports in South Sudan

References

Airports in South Sudan
Pibor Administrative Area